Patulibacter minatonensis  is a Gram-positive bacterium from the genus of Patulibacter which has been isolated from soil in Japan.

References

 

Actinomycetota
Bacteria described in 2006